Endotricha ruminalis is a species of snout moth in the genus Endotricha. It was described by Francis Walker in 1859, and is known from India, Sri Lanka, Malaysia and Taiwan.

References

Moths described in 1859
Endotrichini
Moths of Japan